Callispa is a genus of tortoise beetles (insects in the subfamily Cassidinae).

Species 
 Callispa africana Baly, 1876
 Callispa ajaya Basu, 1999
 Callispa almora Maulik, 1923
 Callispa amabilis Gestro, 1910
 Callispa andrewesi (Weise, 1897)
 Callispa angonina Spaeth, 1935
 Callispa angusta Gressitt, 1950
 Callispa angusticollis Maulik, 1919
 Callispa apicalis Pic, 1924
 Callispa areana Duvivier, 1892
 Callispa assama Maulik, 1919
 Callispa australis (Péringuey, 1898)
 Callispa bayoni Gestro, 1911
 Callispa beccarii Gestro, 1910
 Callispa biarcuata Chen & Yu, 1961
 Callispa bicolor Gestro, 1910
 Callispa bicoloripes (Pic, 1930)
 Callispa bigrimembris Chen & Yu, 1964
 Callispa bijaya (Basu, 1999)
 Callispa bioculata (Uhmann, 1939)
 Callispa bipartita Kung & Yu, 1961
 Callispa boettcheri Uhmann, 1931
 Callispa bottegi Gestro, 1898
 Callispa bowringii Baly, 1858
 Callispa brettinghami Baly, 1869
 Callispa brevicornis Baly, 1869
 Callispa brevipes Maulik, 1919
 Callispa brihata Basu, 1999
 Callispa cassidoides (Guérin-Méneville, 1844)
 Callispa cavicollis Spaeth, 1935
 Callispa coeruleodorsata Maulik, 1919
 Callispa confertae Schöller, 2007
 Callispa corpulenta Uhmann, 1954
 Callispa cribrata Gestro, 1896
 Callispa cruentomarginata Schöller, 2007
 Callispa cumingii Baly, 1858
 Callispa curta Weise, 1897
 Callispa cyanea Chen & Yu, 1961
 Callispa cyanipennis Pic, 1924
 Callispa daurica Mannerhiem Hua, 2002
 Callispa debilis Gressitt & Kimoto, 1963
 Callispa dimidiatipennis Baly, 1858
 Callispa donckieri Pic, 1924
 Callispa doriae Gestro, 1910
 Callispa drescheri Uhmann, 1935
 Callispa duodecimaculata Chapuis, 1876
 Callispa elegans Baly, 1876
 Callispa elliptica Gressitt, 1939
 Callispa elongata Pic, 1924
 Callispa errans Péringuey, 1908
 Callispa expansicollis Maulik, 1919
 Callispa fallax Uhmann, 1930-1932
 Callispa feae Baly, 1888
 Callispa filiformis L Medvedev, 1992
 Callispa flaveola Uhmann, 1931
 Callispa flavescens Weise, 1891
 Callispa flavonotata Pic, 1924
 Callispa fortunii Baly, 1858
 Callispa fraudulenta Würmli, 1976
 Callispa frontalis L Medvedev, 1992
 Callispa fulva Gestro, 1897
 Callispa fulvescens Chen & Yu, 1961
 Callispa fulvipes Spaeth, 1935
 Callispa fulvonigra Maulik, 1919
 Callispa galinae L Medvedev, 1992
 Callispa gracilicornis Weise, 1910
 Callispa guttata Uhmann, 1933
 Callispa hessei Uhmann, 1934
 Callispa himalayana L Medvedev, 1993
 Callispa horni Uhmann, 1927
 Callispa ianthorufa Schöller, 2007
 Callispa impressa Uhmann, 1942
 Callispa induta Uhmann, 1930
 Callispa insignis Baly, 1858
 Callispa intermedia Uhmann, 1932
 Callispa jaya Basu, 1999
 Callispa kabakovi L Medvedev, 1992
 Callispa kalshoveni Uhmann, 1955
 Callispa karena Maulik, 1919
 Callispa kilimana Kolbe, 1891
 Callispa krishnashunda Maulik, 1919
 Callispa kuntzeni Uhmann, 1932
 Callispa lamottei Uhmann, 1954
 Callispa limbata Gestro, 1906
 Callispa limbifera Yu & Kang, 1961
 Callispa loxia Weise, 1897
 Callispa luzonica Pic, 1930
 Callispa maculipennis Gestro, 1911
 Callispa maindoni (Pic, 1943)
 Callispa marginipennis Gestro, 1899
 Callispa marshalli Spaeth, 1935
 Callispa mashonensis Spaeth, 1935
 Callispa metroxylonis Uhmann, 1929
 Callispa minima Gestro, 1902
 Callispa minor Gestro, 1888
 Callispa montivaga Maulik, 1919
 Callispa mungphua Maulik, 1919
 Callispa nagaja Maulik, 1919
 Callispa natalensis Baly, 1858
 Callispa neavei Spaeth, 1935
 Callispa nigricollis Chen & Yu, 1961
 Callispa nigricornis Baly, 1858
 Callispa nigripennis Chen & Yu, 1964
 Callispa nigripes Baly, 1858
 Callispa nigritarsata Maulik, 1919
 Callispa nigronotata (Pic, 1931)
 Callispa nigrovittata Gestro, 1917
 Callispa nyakaensis Uhmann, 1934
 Callispa nyassica Spaeth, 1935
 Callispa obliqua Chen & Yu, 1964
 Callispa octopunctata Baly, 1858
 Callispa ovata Gestro, 1899
 Callispa paharia Basu, 1999
 Callispa pallida Gestro, 1888
 Callispa pelengana Uhmann, 1954
 Callispa penangana Uhmann, 1953
 Callispa philippinica Uhmann, 1931
 Callispa picitarsis Uhmann, 1930-1932
 Callispa picta Maulik, 1919
 Callispa popovi Chen & Yu, 1961
 Callispa porcedens Uhmann, 1939
 Callispa pretiosum Hua, 2002
 Callispa pseudapicalis Yu, 1985
 Callispa puella Gestro, 1919
 Callispa puellaris Pic, 1930
 Callispa pusilla Gestro, 1896
 Callispa recticollis L Medvedev, 1992
 Callispa regularis Uhmann, 1954
 Callispa rhodesiaca Spaeth, 1935
 Callispa roepkei Uhmann, 1929
 Callispa ruficollis Fairmaire, 1889
 Callispa rufiventris Uhmann, 1928
 Callispa scutellaris Weise, 1897
 Callispa sebakue Péringuey, 1908
 Callispa semirufa Kraatz, 1895
 Callispa septemmaculata Weise, 1908
 Callispa signata (Motschulsky)
 Callispa silacea Weise, 1902
 Callispa similis Uhmann, 1931
 Callispa simillima Würmli, 1976
 Callispa spaethi Uhmann, 1931
 Callispa specialis Yu, 1985
 Callispa splendidula Gestro, 1897
 Callispa steineri Schöller, 2007
 Callispa submarginata L Medvedev, 1993
 Callispa sundara Maulik, 1919
 Callispa tarsata Baly, 1869
 Callispa testacea Kraatz, 1895
 Callispa testaceicornis Pic, 1925
 Callispa testaceipes Pic, 1924
 Callispa tibangana Uhmann, 1939
 Callispa ugandina Spaeth, 1935
 Callispa uhmanni Chen & Yu, 1961
 Callispa umtalina Péringuey, 1908
 Callispa undulata Uhmann, 1933
 Callispa unicolor Weise, 1904
 Callispa uniformis Uhmann, 1943
 Callispa vietnamica Kimoto, 1998
 Callispa vioaceicornis Pic, 1937
 Callispa vittata Baly, 1858
 Callispa voronovae L Medvedev, 1992
 Callispa whitei Baly, 1858

References 

 Lee, C.F. ; J. Świętojańska & C.L. Staines, 2012: A review of the genus Callispa Baly, 1858 in Taiwan (Coleoptera: Chrysomelidae: Cassidinae: Callispini), with descriptions of two new species and their immature stages, and notes on their bionomy. Zoological Studies 51 (6), pages 832-861
 Shameem, K.M.; Prathapan, K.D. 2013: A new species of Callispa Baly (Coleoptera, Chrysomelidae, Cassidinae, Callispini) infesting coconut palm (Cocos nucifera L.) in India. ZooKeys, 269, pages 1–10,

External links 
 

 

Cassidinae
Chrysomelidae genera